The Three Rivers Capital Pittsburgh Open or simply Pittsburgh Open is a yearly professional squash tournament held in Pittsburgh, Pennsylvania, United States. It is part of the PSA World Tour.

Results
These are the results from 2011 onwards:

See also
 PSA World Tour
 WSA World Tour

References

PSA World Tour
Squash tournaments in the United States